Chamaesphecia ramburi is a moth of the family Sesiidae found in France, Spain and Portugal.

The larvae feed on Phlomis herbaventi and Phlomis lychnitis.

References

Moths described in 1866
Sesiidae
Moths of Europe